The Algemeiner Journal, known informally as The Algemeiner, is a newspaper based in New York City that covers American and international Jewish and Israel-related news.

History 

In 1972, Gershon Jacobson founded the Yiddish-language Der Algemeiner Journal, after consulting the Lubavitcher Rebbe Menachem Mendel Schneerson. Jacobson served as the paper's editor and publisher from its inception until he died in 2005.

Der Algemeiner Journal Corporation published the inaugural issue on February 23, 1972. The ten-page paper was priced at 25 cents. Twenty thousand issues were printed. Der Algemeiner Journal intended to fill the gap after the daily Yiddish paper Der Tog Morgen Zhurnal closed in 1971. Jacobson had earlier written and served as its city editor. The largest-circulation Yiddish weekly in the United States, Der Algemeiner Journal emphasized Jewish community news, with a politically independent viewpoint, including reporting on tensions between rival Hasidic sects. Although Jacobson was a Lubavitcher Chasid, according to The New York Times, he "defied easy categorization." 

At its peak, Der Algemeiners circulation neared 100,000. In 1989, in response to the increasing marginalization of Yiddish in the Jewish community, Der Algemeiner Journal began printing a four-page English supplement in the middle of the paper, attracting a more diverse Jewish audience. 

The Algemeiners Advisory Board was chaired by Nobel laureate, writer, and activist Elie Wiesel.

In May 2005, after Gershon Jacobson died, his elder son, Simon Jacobson, became the publisher of Der Algemeiner Journal. He founded the Gershon Jacobson Jewish Continuity Foundation (GJCF), a Jewish media organization with the mission to serve as a voice for Jews and Israel. In 2008, he reconceived Der Algemeiner Journal as an English-language publication, replacing the Yiddish "Der" in its title for "The". That year, Dovid Efune became the editor-in-chief of what was called The Algemeiner and Director of the GJCF. Efune left his position in November 2021 to join the New York Sun, but remained on the board.

In 2012, the GJCF launched the website Algemeiner.com.

Content and circulation 
The Algemeiner print edition is published every Friday, except during Passover and Sukkot. Its circulation is about 23,000. It is sold at newsstands internationally and available for subscription. It can also be viewed as an ePaper on Algemeiner.com. The vast majority of The Algemeiner content is online.

During the United States presidency of George Bush, Sr., Algemeiner had among the harshest editorial lines on the Bush administration's efforts in the Israel-Palestinian peace process to roll back settlements. This perspective placed the publication outside the Jewish mainstream at the time.

In 2020, Reuters reported that Algemeiner and the Jerusalem Post had published op-eds credited to "Oliver Taylor", a fabricated "reporter" whose identity could not be verified, and was thought to be "created by similar machine learning methods used to create deepfakes". One of the opinion articles by this fake author called Mazen Masri, a legal scholar at City University London and his wife Ryvka Barnard, a Palestinian human rights activist, "known terrorist sympathizers", which both denied.

In 2020, Algemeiner editor-in-chief Dovid Efune said the publication is largely funded by small donors who support the site's message.

Annual events and lists

The Algemeiner began hosting its "Jewish 100" gala in 2014, an elaboration on its annual dinner. Donald Trump and Melissa Rivers headlined the 2015 event, presenting short speeches and accepting awards for Algemeiner'''s recognition of their support of the Jewish people and Israel.

See also
 The Forward''

References

External links 
Official website

Newspapers published in Brooklyn
Jewish newspapers published in the United States
1972 establishments in New York City
Publications established in 1972
Yiddish-language newspapers published in the United States